Martin Glynn (born 7 January 1951) is a Canadian bobsledder. He competed in the four man event at the 1980 Winter Olympics.

References

1951 births
Living people
Canadian male bobsledders
Olympic bobsledders of Canada
Bobsledders at the 1980 Winter Olympics
Place of birth missing (living people)